The Oracle Database OLAP Option implements  On-line Analytical Processing (OLAP) within an Oracle database environment. Oracle Corporation markets the Oracle Database OLAP Option as an extra-cost option to supplement the "Enterprise Edition" of its database. (Oracle offers Essbase for customers without the Oracle Database or who require multiple data-sources to load their cubes.) 

As of Oracle Database 11g, the Oracle database optimizer can transparently redirect SQL queries to levels within the OLAP Option cubes.  The cubes are managed and can take the place of multi-dimensional materialized views, simplifying Oracle data-warehouse management and speeding up query response.

Logical components 

The Oracle Database OLAP Option offers:

 an OLAP analytic  engine
 workspaces
 an analytic workspace manager (AWM)
 a worksheet environment
 OLAP DML for  DDL and  DML
 an interface from SQL 
 an analytic workspace  Java  API
 a Java-based OLAP API

Physical implementation 

The Oracle database tablespace CWMLITE stores OLAPSYS schema  objects and integrates Oracle Database OLAP Option with the Oracle Warehouse Builder (OWB). 
The CWMLITE name reflects the use of CWM — the Common Warehouse Metamodel, which Oracle Corporation refers to as "Common Warehouse Metadata".

See also 
 Business intelligence
 Comparison of OLAP servers
 Essbase

External links 
 Oracle Technology Network on Oracle OLAP, retrieved 2006-11-30

References 

Oracle software
Online analytical processing